Sumaré Atlético Clube, commonly known as Sumaré, is a Brazilian football club based in Sumaré, São Paulo state.

History
The club was founded on December 9, 2005, by the businessman Gilberto Pitareli, adopting similar colors and kits as Colombia's national team, and professionalized its football department in 2006, competing for the first time in a professional competition in the 2006 Campeonato Paulista Segunda Divisão.

Stadium
Sumaré Atlético Clube play their home games at Estádio Municipal José Pereira. The stadium has a maximum capacity of 5,000 people.

See also
 Ponte Preta Sumaré Futebol Clube

References

 
Association football clubs established in 2005
2005 establishments in Brazil